Behbudi or Behboodi also known as Pabuto in Pukhto is a village in the Chach Valley of Attock District in northern Punjab Province of Pakistan. It is located close to the borders of Khyber-Pakhtunkhwa.

The city of Hazro lies about 3.8 km away from it. The nearby villages are Malak Mala, Nartopa and Shinka. The population is Pashtun (ethnic afghan) and speak the Northern dialect of Pashto 

Behbudi people are known to be hospitable and welcoming to refugees, they have carried out the pakhtun principle nanwatay since the founding of the village. Many other pakhtuns from Afghanistan and NWFP have settled here recently.

References

Villages in Attock District